Julie Cromer is the athletic director at Ohio University in Athens, Ohio and is currently serving as a co-chair of the NCAA Division I Transformation Committee. She is the first female athletic director at Ohio.

Early years
Julie Cromer grew up in Southern Missouri.  She received her Bachelor's degree from Missouri State University.  She earned a Master's degree in Policy Analysis from Indiana University

Career
She began her career in athletics working for the Midwestern Collegiate Conference.  She later served as assistant athletic director at Wright State University.  She left Wright State to begin a ten year duration at the NCAA where she served as director of academic and membership affairs.  She then served as executive associate athletics director and SWA at Indiana University for four years and the senior deputy athletics director at the University of Arkansas for six years.

Ohio
On August 31, 2019, she was hired by Ohio University to become the schools athletic director following Jim Schaus who left to become the Commissioner of the Southern Conference. During her first year, the Ohio Football Team won the Idaho Potato Bowl.   The following year the Ohio Men's Basketball Team won the 2020 MAC men's basketball tournament and upset ACC regular season champion Virginia Cavaliers in the first round of the NCAA tournament. This was the school's first tournament win since a sweet sixteen appearance in 2012.

On July 14, Cromer promoted long time offensive coordinator Tim Albin to head football coach at Ohio following the unexpected retirement of Solich prior to the 2021 season.  After struggling to a 3–9 record in 2021, Albin led the Bobcats to a 7–1 mark in the MAC in 2022 as Ohio won the MAC East for the first time since 2016. They lost to Toledo in the MAC Championship Game.  Ohio defeated Wyoming in the Arizona Bowl

References

External links
Ohio Bobcats Athletics bio

Living people
Ohio Bobcats athletic directors
Missouri State University alumni
Indiana University alumni
Women college athletic directors in the United States
Year of birth missing (living people)